Jason Neill (born October 28, 1992) is a former American professional gridiron football defensive lineman.

College career
Neill played college football for the UTSA Roadrunners from 2011 to 2015.

Professional career
Neill signed with the Dallas Cowboys in May 2016. After being waived by the Cowboys, he was signed by the Cleveland Browns in August 2016.

He signed with the Calgary Stampeders in September 2016.

He signed with the Hamilton Tiger-Cats in April 2017.

On October 15, 2019, Neill was drafted in the 9th round during phase three in the 2020 XFL Draft by the Tampa Bay Vipers. He had his contract terminated when the league suspended operations on April 10, 2020.

References

External links
 Hamilton Tiger-Cats bio

1992 births
Living people
American football defensive linemen
Canadian football defensive linemen
People from Flower Mound, Texas
Players of American football from Texas
Sportspeople from the Dallas–Fort Worth metroplex
American players of Canadian football
UTSA Roadrunners football players
Hamilton Tiger-Cats players
Tampa Bay Vipers players